William Rolfe Kerr (born June 29, 1935) is an emeritus general authority of the Church of Jesus Christ of Latter-day Saints (LDS Church).  He served previously as the fifteenth Commissioner of Church Education and as president of the Logan Utah Temple.

Kerr was born in Tremonton, Utah, and grew up on a farm. He earned a bachelor's degree in agriculture from Utah State University (USU), where he was also the quarterback on the football team. He intending to spend his life farming, until he was offered a position as coordinator of student activities at USU after his military service. He later received a master's degree in marriage and family relations and a doctorate in education. He served an LDS Church mission in the British Mission. While at USU, Kerr played football and was the starting quarterback in 1958.

Career
Kerr made his career in the field of learning, serving in administrative positions at USU, Weber State College and the University of Utah.

President of Dixie State College 
From 1976 to 1980 he was president of Dixie State College of Utah (DSC). Under his leadership, DSC began a cooperative education work program. He also worked to increase ties and cooperation between the college and the surrounding community.

Executive Vice President of Brigham Young University 
Kerr was executive vice president of Brigham Young University (BYU) from 1980 to 1984. Stephen R. Covey quoted Kerr's personal mission statement in The Seven Habits of Highly Effective People.

Commissioner of the Utah System of Higher Education 
Kerr had been serving as commissioner of the Utah System of Higher Education since 1985 when he was called as president of the church's Texas Dallas Mission in 1993.

LDS Church service
Kerr also served in the LDS Church as a stake president, bishop's counselor, high councilor, and on the Sunday School General Board. For two years in the 1960s, he was involved in helping organize the LDS Student Association. While still serving in Dallas, Kerr was called as a general authority and member of the Second Quorum of the Seventy on April 6, 1996, and was transferred to the First Quorum of the Seventy on April 5, 1997. As a general authority, he served in a number of area presidencies prior to being appointed as the Commissioner of the Church Educational System (CES) in 2005. He was released from the First Quorum of the Seventy and granted emeritus status on October 6, 2007, but remained as CES commissioner until being released on August 1, 2008, when he was succeeded by Paul V. Johnson. He then served as president of the Logan Utah Temple from 2008 to 2011.

Personal life
Kerr met Janeil Raybold at USU and they were married September 15, 1960, in the Logan Temple and have six children.

See also
Elaine A. Cannon

References

External links
News of the Church: Elder W. Rolfe Kerr appointed Commissioner of Church Education, Ensign, April 2005.
University of Utah Alumni Profiles: W. Rolfe Kerr

1935 births
20th-century Mormon missionaries
American general authorities (LDS Church)
American Mormon missionaries in the United States
Brigham Young University faculty
Commissioners of Church Education (LDS Church)
Utah Tech University people
Living people
Members of the First Quorum of the Seventy (LDS Church)
Mission presidents (LDS Church)
American Mormon missionaries in England
People from Tremonton, Utah
University of Utah faculty
Utah State University faculty
Weber State University faculty
Young people and the Church of Jesus Christ of Latter-day Saints
Sunday School (LDS Church) people
Temple presidents and matrons (LDS Church)
Latter Day Saints from Utah